The Caledon Shipbuilding & Engineering Company, Limited was a major Scottish shipbuilding company based in Dundee, Scotland that traded for more than a century and built more than 500 ships.

History
W.B. Thompson CBE (1837 - 1923) founded the Tay Foundry in 1866 and the WB Thompson Shipbuilding in 1874. In 1889 the company took over the Marine Engineering Works at Lilybank Foundry. In 1896 WB Thompson was restructured and the name changed to Caledon Shipbuilding & Engineering Company in honour of the founder's first customer, the Earl of Caledon.

In 1932 Caledon closed the Lilybank engine works. In 1968 Caledon merged with Henry Robb of Leith, forming Robb Caledon Shipbuilding Limited. The Caledon Shipyard built its last ships in 1980 and operations ceased there in 1981.

The Caledon yard built a total of 509 ships, plus 20 barges and 34 launches.

W.B. Thompson CBE and his wife Hannah Ogilvie (1836 - 1921) are interred at Western Cemetery, Dundee.

Victoria Drummond, the first woman marine engineer in the UK, completed her apprenticeship with Caledon.

Ships built by Caledon

Ships built by Caledon include:

Naval

Merchant

References

Further reading

1874 establishments in Scotland
Companies based in Dundee
Defunct shipbuilding companies of Scotland
Engineering companies of Scotland
Former defence companies of the United Kingdom
History of Dundee
1981 disestablishments in Scotland
Manufacturing companies established in 1874
British companies established in 1874
British companies disestablished in 1981
British Shipbuilders